Morning Sou’West was a regional programme broadcast in south west England as an opt-out from BBC Radio 4. It was broadcast on weekday mornings between 6:30am and 8:35am, rejoining Today for Yesterday in Parliament when Parliament was sitting - the programme was extended by eight minutes when Parliament was in recess, ending at the same time as the Today programme. The programme was supplemented by five-minute regional news bulletins at 12:55pm and 5:55pm. Morning Sou’West was not broadcast at the weekend although regional news bulletins did air on Saturdays at 6:55am, 7:55am, 12:55pm and 5:55pm. No regional news bulletins were broadcast on Sundays.

The programme was heard across the south west on Radio 4’s FM frequencies as well as on Radio 4’s Plymouth MW relay.

The programme ended on 31 December 1982, 18 days prior to the launch of BBC Radio Devon and BBC Radio Cornwall, both of which launched on 17 January 1983.

The programme’s cessation marked the end of regional programming opt-outs on Radio 4 as by now BBC Local Radio was available across much of England.

See also
Roundabout East Anglia

BBC Radio 4 programmes